Santa Pass is situated in the Mpumalanga province, on the R540 road between Dullstroom and Lydenburg (South Africa).

Mountain passes of Mpumalanga